Liz Berry (born 1980) is a British poet. She has published two pamphlets and one full-length poetry collection. Her poetry collection, Black Country, was named poetry book of the year by several publications, including The Guardian.

Early life and education
Born in 1980, Berry was raised in the Black Country of England. She trained as a school teacher and initially taught in a primary school. She became interested in poetry after taking a beginners' poetry class at a local college. She later attended the Royal Holloway, University of London, where she earned an MA in Creative Writing.

Poetry career
Berry was a recipient of the Eric Gregory Award in 2009. The award is given by the Society of Authors to British poets under the age of 30. Berry's first pamphlet, The Patron Saint of School Girls, was published by tall-lighthouse in 2010.  She won the Poetry London competition in 2012 for the poem Bird.

In 2014, Chatto and Windus published Black Country, Berry's first poetry collection. Black Country won the Forward Prize for Best First Collection, the Geoffrey Faber Memorial Prize, and the Somerset Maugham Award. Black Country was selected as poetry book of the year by several publications, including The Guardian.

Berry's writing is rooted in the landscape and dialect of the West Midlands. In 2014, Ben Wilkinson in The Guardian summarized Black Country: "It digs deep into the poet’s West Midlands roots, enlivening and reimagining the heritage of that eponymous heartland of iron foundries, coal mines and steel mills, on both personal and public footings".

The Republic of Motherhood, Berry's second pamphlet, was published by Chatto and Windus in 2018. The title poem won the Forward Prize for Best Single Poem.

Currently living in Birmingham, Berry works for the Arvon Foundation and other organizations as a poetry tutor.

Works
 (2010)—The Patron Saint of Girls, tall-lighthouse, 
 (2014)—Black Country, Chatto and Windus, 
 (2018)—The Republic of Motherhood, Vintage Digital, 
 (2021)–The Dereliction with Tom Hicks, Hercules Editions
 (2023)–The Home Child, Chatto & Windus,

Awards
 (2018)— Forward Prizes for Poetry for Best Single Poem, Republic of Motherhood 
 (2015)— Somerset Maugham Award for Black Country
 (2014)— Forward Prize for Best First Collection, for Black Country
 (2014)— Geoffrey Faber Memorial Prize
 (2012)— Poetry London competition
 (2009)— Eric Gregory Award

References

External links
Official website

1980 births
Living people
21st-century British writers
British women poets
People from Birmingham, West Midlands
21st-century British women writers